Hales Castle was a medieval castle that once stood overlooking the town of Frome in the Mendip district of Somerset, England. It has been scheduled as an ancient monument.

History

Hales Castle was built, probably in the years immediately after the Norman conquest of England in 1066, overlooking the town of Frome in the Mendip district of Somerset, England. In addition to supporting the Norman control of the local town, it was also close to the River Frome and the Roman road running from Poole Harbour on to the town of Bath, both important lines of communication for the Normans.

It comprises banks and outer ditches and has an unfinished bailey. There may have been a drawbridge at the entrance.

See also
Castles in Great Britain and Ireland
List of castles in England
 Gatehouse for overhead photo and more details

References

Bibliography
Prior, Stuart. (2006) The Norman Art of War: a Few Well-Positioned Castles. Stroud, UK: Tempus. .

Castles in Somerset
Scheduled monuments in Mendip District
Frome